The Yuanshen Sports Centre Stadium is a multi-purpose stadium in Shanghai. It is currently used mostly for association football matches. The stadium has a maximum seating capacity for 16,000 spectators.

Apart from the stadium there is a 5,000 seater Yuanshen Gymnasium which hosted Shanghai Sharks until 2021 and swimming pool.

Events 
 Super Show 2 by the South Korean boy band Super Junior on 18 October 2009 and the official opening performance of the 11th Shanghai International Art Festival, hosted by China's the Ministry of Culture.
 On 19 April 2008 the arena hosted Japanese rock band L'Arc~en~Ciel as part of their "TOUR 2008 L'7 ~Trans ASIA via PARIS~"

References 

Football venues in China
Rugby union stadiums in China
Sports venues in Shanghai
Multi-purpose stadiums in China
Badminton venues
Badminton in China
Sports venues completed in 2000
2000 establishments in China
World Rugby Sevens Series venues